Posterior tibial may refer to:
 Posterior tibial artery
 Posterior tibial vein